Kevin Francis Laidlaw (born 9 August 1934 at Nightcaps) is a former All Blacks rugby union player from New Zealand, and is the only All Black from Ohai-Nightcaps.

Laidlaw represented New Zealand in 17 games, including 3 tests. He made his test debut for New Zealand against South Africa at Cape Town on 23 July 1960. His last test was also against South Africa, at Port Elizabeth on 27 August 1960.

He was educated at St. Kevin's College, Oamaru.

References
The Encyclopaedia of New Zealand Rugby by Ron Palenski, Rod Chester & Neville McMillan, page 119 (4th edition 2005, Hodder Moa Beckett, Auckland) 

1934 births
Living people
New Zealand rugby union players
New Zealand international rugby union players
People educated at St Kevin's College, Oamaru
People from Nightcaps, New Zealand
Southland rugby union players
Rugby union players from Southland, New Zealand
Rugby union centres